Baška Voda is a municipality in Croatia in the Split-Dalmatia County. It has a population of 2,775 (2011 census), 96.2% of which are Croats. It is located on the Adriatic coastline of Dalmatia 10 km northwest of Makarska.

Climate

Baška Voda has very pleasant Mediterranean climate with many sunny days.

History
The name Baška Voda is mythological in origin and is linked with Biston, the patriarch of the Thracian Biston tribe, son of Ares, the Greek god of war, and the goddess Calliope, protectress of water. The military fort and springs near Baška Voda bear out this theory. Some of the richest archaeological sites that have yielded finds from Roman times are on the heights of Gradina and its surroundings.

These include burial sites with urns, lamps, jewellery, coins with the head of Alexander Severus Aurelianus and headstones bearing the names of 13 of the ancient inhabitants of Baška Voda, the loveliest of which commemorates a boy called Ursinus, who died in a shipwreck between 100 and 150 AD.

In ancient times, the little village of Bast nestled by a freshwater spring which supplied the Biokovo area. During the 18th century, after the expulsion of the Turks, its inhabitant left the slopes of St. Ilija's (Elijah's) Ridge and descended to the shore, where they established Baška Voda, today a well-known tourist resort on the Makarska Riviera.

Baška Voda first appeared on the “Coranelli” geographical map, produced in 1688, as “Basca”. It was a small village which thrived on agriculture and fishing. The Late Baroque church of St. Lovro (Laurence), built in 1750, probably occupies an Antique site, while the parish church of St. Nikola (Nicholas), the patron saint of travellers and sailors, was built in the early 20th century.

The town along with its surroundings appear in the video game Gran Turismo Sport as a fictional racetrack.

Image gallery

References

Sources

External links

Tourist Board Baška Voda website

Populated places in Split-Dalmatia County
Municipalities of Croatia
Populated coastal places in Croatia